The Transcaucasian Trail (TCT) is a long-distance hiking trail under development in the Caucasus through Georgia and Armenia. It has been called one of the world's greatest places by Time in 2019.

A long-distance trail in the Caucasus has been a lingering idea for trekkers and hikers for many years since they started hiking remote parts of the region.

Many sections of the TCT already exist, used by local community members and shepherds for centuries. These trails cross long valleys and traverse mammoth mountains to connect mountain villages together. In recent years many of these trails have fallen into disrepair, and while many trails are known to locals, they are difficult to navigate for visitors and tourists.

In 2015, two former Peace Corps volunteers, Paul Stephens and Jeff Haack, mapped and charted known routes in the Republic of Georgia. During this time they succeeded in locating many connections between known trails and publicizing the concept of a long-distance trail. At the same time, explorer Tom Allen began an attempt to hike the length of the Republic of Armenia, which was unsuccessful due to an absence of known routes and detailed maps. Allen devised a 'Transcaucasian Trail' project to remedy these problems, and discovered Stephens' shared vision when attempting to register the same domain name, at which time the two decided to collaborate.

In late 2015, Allen approached 4x4 manufacturer Land Rover and the Royal Geographical Society for funding to scout a potential route traversing the Lesser Caucasus through Armenia and southern Georgia, launching the 'Transcaucasian Expedition' in April 2016. In July of the same year, Stephens initiated the first trail construction and maintenance project in Svaneti, Georgia, employing international volunteers to carry out the work. The Transcaucasian Trail Association nonprofit organisation and Transcaucasian Trail Armenia NGO were formed later that year.

In 2017, the volunteer trail building programme expanded to Dilijan National Park in Armenia and continued in the Svaneti region of Georgia. Today, over 400 km of the proposed route of the trail has been improved and marked in Georgia and Armenia.

The long-term goal is to build two trail corridors of approximately 1,500 km each. The "northern route" would follow the Greater Caucasus Mountains through northern Georgia and Azerbaijan from the Black Sea and the Caspian Sea, though parts of this route are problematic due to conflict zones. Meanwhile, a "southern route" will traverse the Lesser Caucasus Mountains through southern Georgia and Armenia, taking hikers from the Black Sea to the River Arax at Armenia's border with Iran.

References

Further reading 
 This new trail reveals the wonders of Armenia—a country at the crossroads of the world
 http://georgiatoday.ge/news/1828/Get-Your-Boots-On%253A-The-Spectacular-Transcaucasian-Trail-is-Open%2521
 https://www.theguardian.com/travel/2016/aug/27/georgia-new-transcaucasian-hiking-trail-project
 https://www.smithsonianmag.com/travel/armenia-becoming-world-class-hiking-destination-180965096/
 http://www.tedxtbilisi.com/paul-stephens/

External links 
 

Hiking trails in Georgia (country)
Hiking trails in Armenia
Tourist attractions in Azerbaijan